Aavanikunnile Kinnaripookkal is a 1991 Indian Malayalam film, directed by 	Paul Babu, starring Kakka Ravi and Karthika in the lead roles (in her last film before retiring from the movie industry).

Plot

Dr. Rajalakshmi is still grieving the son she lost 25 years ago. She is living with her niece Indu. Rajalakshmi meets Raju, a medical representative. Indu also meets Raju and they fall for each other. Though Raju claims his parents are living in Philadelphia, on later scenes it is revealed that he is an orphan raised in a Christian orphanage.

Balan Menon is a relative of Rajalakshmi and has feelings for her since their youth. Rajalakshmi frequently tries to avoid Balan Menon's proposals to start a fresh life together.

Raju requests Rajalakshmi for Indu's hand in marriage. Rajalakshmi refuses this since Raju is an orphan. Balan Menon tries to convince Rajalakshmi, but fails. Raju and Indu decides to part their way for the sake of Rajalakshmi. Rajalakshmi goes to the orphanage and realize that Raju is her own son.

The film ends in tragedy with Raju dying in a bike accident on the way to meet Rajalakshmi.

Cast
 Kakka Ravi as Raju
 K. R. Vijaya as Rajalakshmi
 Karthika as Indu
 Nedumudi Venu as Balan Menon
 Ashokan as Ajayan (Aji)
 Babu Namboothiri as Father
 Jagathy Sreekumar as Stephan Thomas
 Innocent as Idiyan Kesava Pillai
 T. P. Madhavan as Lonappan
 M. G. Soman as Jayamohan (only in photo)

Soundtrack
All songs written by ONV Kurup.

"Erinjadangi" - KJ Yesudas
"Janmangal Than" - KJ Yesudas, KS Chithra
"Kuliru Peyyunna" - KJ Yesudas, KS Chithra
"Shaanthayaam Shyamayaam" - KJ Yesudas
"Snehathe Vaazhthi" - KJ Yesudas

Trivia
 The plot is very similar to that of earlier release January Oru Orma where Karthika and M. G. Soman played identical roles.
The film was released after years in making.

References

External links

1991 films
1990s Malayalam-language films
Films scored by Ouseppachan